This is a list of beaches of the Isle of Wight:

A 

 Alum Bay

B 

 Bembridge Beach
 Binnel Bay
 Binstead
 Bouldnor
 Brighstone Bay
 Brook Bay

C 

 Castle Cove
 Chale Bay
 Colwell Bay
 Compton Bay
 Cowes

F 

 Fort Victoria
 Freshwater Bay

G 

 Gurnard Bay

H 

 Horseshoe Bay

L 

 Luccombe Bay

M 

 Monks Bay
 Mount Bay

N 

 Newtown Bay

O 

 Orchard Bay
 Osborne Bay

P 

 Palmer's Brook
 Priory Bay
 Puckpool

R 

 Reeth Bay
 Ryde Beach

S 

 Sandown Bay
 Scratchell's Bay
 Seagrove Bay
 Steel Bay
 St Helen's Duver

T 

 Thorness Bay
 Totland Bay

V 

 Ventnor Beach

W 

 Watcombe Bay
 Watershoot Bay
 Wheelers Bay
 Whitecliff Bay
 Woodside Beach
 Woody Bay

Y 

 Yaverland Beach

See also 

 List of tourist attractions in the Isle of Wight

References 

Isle of Wight
Isle of Wight-related lists